Koraće is a village of Brod, Bosnia and Herzegovina.

References

Populated places in Brod, Bosnia and Herzegovina